Caio championi is a large moth of the family Saturniidae first described by Druce in 1886. It is found from Mexico to Guatemala, south to western Ecuador and northern Venezuela.

Subspecies
Caio championi championi
Caio championi columbiana (Rothschild, 1907) (Colombia)

References

Moths of Central America
Moths described in 1886
Arsenurinae